Qalayen (also Romanized as Qalāyen; also known as Kaleh Yan and Qal‘eh Yan) is a village in Badr Rural District, in the Central District of Ravansar County, Kermanshah Province, Iran. At the 2006 census, its population was 211, in 39 families.

References 

Populated places in Ravansar County